Exoteleia is a genus of moths in the family Gelechiidae.

Species
Exoteleia anomala Hodges, 1985
Exoteleia burkei Keifer, 1932
Exoteleia californica (Busck, 1907) (Paralechia)
Exoteleia dodecella (Linnaeus, 1758) (Phalaena)
Exoteleia graphicella (Busck, 1903) (Gnorimoschema)
Exoteleia ithycosma (Meyrick, 1914)
Exoteleia nepheos Freeman, 1967
Exoteleia pinifoliella (Chambers, 1880) (Gelechia)
Exoteleia succinctella (Zeller, 1872) (Gelechia)

Former species
Exoteleia oribatella (Rebel, 1918) (Gelechia)

References

External links
Checklist of Gelechiidae (Lepidoptera) in America North of Mexico

 
Litini
Moth genera